Weasel While You Work is a 1958 Warner Bros. Merrie Melodies animated short directed by Robert McKimson. The cartoon was released on September 6, 1958, and features Foghorn Leghorn and the Barnyard Dawg. The weasel seen in this short previously appeared in Plop Goes the Weasel (1953) and Weasel Stop (1956).

Unlike many Foghorn shorts, this one takes place during the winter. The title is a pun on the phrase "whistle while you work".

Plot
At wintertime, Foghorn grabs Barnyard Dawg from his doghouse, coats him in snow, and puts snowman decorations on him. Dawg emerges from the snowman and says he'll "moidah da bum!". He sharpens one of Foghorn's ice skates, which causes Foghorn to fall through the ice when he skates a circle. In revenge, Foghorn rolls a snowball down the hill toward Dawg, who moves out of the way, doghouse and all, just before the now giant snowball hits a curve and flies back at Foghorn, burying him. Foghorn emerges, declaring "That dog's like taxes. He just don't know when to stop".

Suddenly, Foghorn is attacked by a ravenously hungry weasel who gnaws Foghorn's leg. Foghorn grabs the weasel and asks him if he wouldn't prefer some venison. Foghorn slips antlers onto Dawg's head and directs the weasel to him. The weasel attacks Dawg's leg. Dawg notices the antlers and removes them, and asks the weasel how he'd like some frozen chicken.

Foghorn is knocked unconscious when his sled hits a log Dawg has placed in his path. While Foghorn is down, Dawg covers him in water, which freezes him. Dawg tells weasel to eat hearty, so the weasel hits the frozen Foghorn with an axe. Foghorn says he's got a splitting headache and falls in half. To get revenge, Foghorn traps Dawg in a corset making him look like a seal and gives him to the weasel to cook. While being peppered, Dawg sneezes, which causes an avalanche of snow to fall on him. A furious Dawg tells the weasel that he's a dog and that he should get a chicken instead, cryptically pointing out Foghorn tricking him. ("What you want is a chicken! R-A-T. Chicken."). Later, the skiing Foghorn hits a tall pole and slides into a cooking pot, where the weasel is hungrily waiting. Foghorn bolts, but Dawg hands a club to the weasel, who chases Foghorn until he is distracted by a huge Foghorn ice statue, which he proceeds to gnaw on.

The real Foghorn, watching from behind a tree, thinks his troubles are over until at least the Fourth of July. In the final setpiece, Foghorn pulls on what he thinks is Barnyard Dawg's tail from his doghouse, but it's revealed to be a lit rocket that shoots Foghorn into the sky. As the cartoon ends, Dawg remarks: "The Fourth of July came a little oily this year! Heh heh heh...".

Production
This is one of six cartoons scored by using stock music by John Seely of Capitol Records from the Hi-Q library because of a musicians' strike in 1958. The others are A Bird in a Bonnet, Hook, Line and Stinker, Pre-Hysterical Hare, Gopher Broke, and Hip Hip-Hurry!.

Mel Blanc supplied the voices of Foghorn Leghorn, Barnyard Dawg, and the weasel.

Cartoon Network region error
In 2016, Cartoon Network USA accidentally used the Russian dubbed version of the short instead of the English version and ran it several times. The regional incident was a mistake to Cartoon Network.

Critical response
According to Michael Samerdyke, Weasel While You Work is "a very strong late Foghorn Leghorn cartoon .... The only jarring note, as several writers have noted, is the music by John Seely", which Samerdyke says is ill-suited to the Warner Bros. style.

The short was reviewed in Hollywood Classics, volume 23.

Cast
 Mel Blanc – Foghorn Leghorn / Barnyard Dawg / Willy the Weasel

See also
 List of American films of 1958

References

External links
 

1958 films
1958 short films
1958 comedy films
1958 animated films
1950s English-language films
1950s Warner Bros. animated short films
Merrie Melodies short films
Barnyard Dawg films
Foghorn Leghorn films
Films about weasels
Animated films about revenge
Films set on farms
Films set in 1958
Winter in culture
Films directed by Robert McKimson
Films with screenplays by Michael Maltese
Warner Bros. Cartoons animated short films